The men's discus throw event at the 2001 European Athletics U23 Championships was held in Amsterdam, Netherlands, at Olympisch Stadion on 12 and 14 July.

Medalists

Results

Final
14 July

Qualifications
12 July
Qualifying 57.00 or 12 best to the Final

Group A

Group B

Participation
According to an unofficial count, 19 athletes from 16 countries participated in the event.

 (1)
 (1)
 (1)
 (3)
 (1)
 (1)
 (1)
 (2)
 (1)
 (1)
 (1)
 (1)
 (1)
 (1)
 (1)
 (1)

References

Discus throw
Discus throw at the European Athletics U23 Championships